Franklin Mitchell may refer to:
 Franklin Mitchell (Wisconsin politician) (1824–1911), Wisconsin State Assemblyman
 W. Franklin Mitchell, American politician in North Carolina
 Frank Mitchell (politician) (born 1925), politician in British Columbia, Canada

See also
Frank Mitchell (disambiguation)